is a Japanese aggregate corporation whose membership consists of 72% percent of all dentists in Japan. The corporation was established in 1903 by dentist Kisai Takayama and others in order to promote the interests of dentists and their patients.

References

External links 
Official website

Dental organizations
Medical and health organizations based in Japan
1903 establishments in Japan